Alan Rhodes is an English former professional rugby league footballer who played in the 1960s and 1970s, and coached in the 1980s. Alan Rhodes is a keen golfer, and won the Halifax-Huddersfield Alliance's Geoff Cockin Trophy partnering former Halifax Town chairman Geoff Ralph.

Background
Alan Rhodes was born in Bradford, West Riding of Yorkshire, England.

Playing career
Alan Rhodes played, and scored a try, and 2-goals in Huddersfield's 10-15 defeat by Wakefield Trinity in the 1968 Challenge Cup semi-final replay during the 1967–68 season at Headingley Rugby Stadium, Leeds on Wednesday 3 April 1968, the first match having ended in a 0-0 draw at Odsal Stadium, Bradford on Saturday 30 March 1968.

County Cup Final appearances
Alan Rhodes played left-, i.e. number 4, in Bradford Northern's 17-8 victory over Hunslet in the 1965 Yorkshire County Cup Final during the 1965–66 season at Headingley Rugby Stadium, Leeds on Saturday 16 October 1965.

References

External links

Search for "Rhodes" at rugbyleagueproject.org
Photograph "Fisher and Rhodes - Hooker T Fisher and A Rhodes bring down Bramley off-half Wolford - 02/11/1969" at rlhp.co.uk
Photograph "Alan Rhodes - Alan Rhodes (making a fine comeback after recovering from a broken leg) takes a low pass off Neil Fox to race away and score. - 01/01/1970" at rlhp.co.uk
Photograph "Alan Rhodes' Perfect Pass - Full back Alan Rhodes gets in a perfect pass to centre N. Fox (who went in to score) as two Featherstone Rovers move in. - 22/03/1970" at rlhp.co.uk
Photograph "The 1981 squad pictured at Odsal - The 1981 squad who retained the Championship. - 01/01/1981" at rlhp.co.uk
Photograph "Rathbone gets weighed in - Alan Rathbone, the recent signing from Leigh is weighed in watched by his team mates. - 01/01/1981" at rlhp.co.uk
Photograph "Bradford Northern's Yorkshire Cup squad 1982 - Bradford Northern's Yorkshire Cup Final Squad 1982. - 02/10/1982" at rlhp.co.uk
Photograph "Billy and Blue - Billy Kells and Blue Kingi, recent signings in November 1982. - 19/11/1982" at rlhp.co.uk
Photograph "Northern's Cup semi final squad 1983 - Northern's semi final squad v. Featherstone in 1983. - 26/03/1983" at rlhp.co.uk

1940s births
Living people
Bradford Bulls players
English rugby league players
Huddersfield Giants players
Rugby league centres
Rugby league fullbacks
Rugby league players from Bradford
Year of birth missing (living people)